The 1965 Detroit Lions season was the 36th season in franchise history. Harry Gilmer replaced George Wilson as the Lions head coach. The Lions failed to improve on their 1964 record of 7–5–2, finishing at 6–7–1.

The last remaining active member of the 1965 Detroit Lions was Wally Hilgenberg, who played his final NFL game in the 1979 season, although he missed the 1967 season.

Offseason

NFL Draft

Regular season

Schedule 

 Thursday (November 25: Thanksgiving)

Standings

Roster

Playoffs 

Did not qualify.

Awards and records

References 

 Detroit Lions on Pro Football Reference
 Detroit Lions on jt-sw.com
 Detroit Lions on The Football Database

Detroit Lions
Detroit Lions seasons
Detroit Lions